Vaega Van Tuinei (born February 16, 1971 in Garden Grove, California is a former professional American football player who played defensive end for four seasons for the San Diego Chargers, Indianapolis Colts, and Chicago Bears.

He is of Samoan descent. His son, Lavasier Tuinei, plays in the Canadian Football League.

References

1971 births
Living people
American sportspeople of Samoan descent
People from Garden Grove, California
Players of American football from California
American football defensive ends
Arizona Wildcats football players
San Diego Chargers players
Sportspeople from Orange County, California
Indianapolis Colts players
Chicago Bears players